Cary Street Park and Shop Center, also known as the Cary Court Shopping Center, is a historic shopping center developed by the C.F. Sauer family  in the Carytown district of Richmond, Virginia. It was built in 1938 in the Art Deco style. Two rectangular wings to the west and east were completed in 1949 and 1951. The structure is essentially a one-story structure in the shape of an elongated "U" and constructed of brick, granite, limestone and marble veneer. It features a prominent parking area, an uninterrupted string of large modern aluminum and glass doors and commercial storefront windows, a stepped limestone parapet, curved windows, and a low, projecting stucco canopy.

It was listed on the National Register of Historic Places in 2001.

References

External links
Carytown website

Commercial buildings on the National Register of Historic Places in Virginia
Art Deco architecture in Virginia
Commercial buildings completed in 1938
Buildings and structures in Richmond, Virginia
National Register of Historic Places in Richmond, Virginia
Department stores on the National Register of Historic Places